Janata Dal (Samajbadi Prajatantrik) (Nepali for 'People's Party (Democratic Socialist)') is a political party in Nepal. The party is led by Keshar Jung Rayamjhi, a historic communist leader who turned into an ally of the royal house.

Socialist parties in Nepal